Blackhole DNS servers are Domain Name System (DNS) servers that return a "nonexistent address" answer to reverse DNS lookups for addresses reserved for private use.

Background
There are several ranges of network addresses reserved for use on private networks in IPv4:

Even though traffic to or from these addresses should never appear on the public Internet, it is not uncommon for such traffic to appear anyway.

Role
To deal with this problem, the Internet Assigned Numbers Authority (IANA) has set up three special DNS servers called "blackhole servers". Currently the blackhole servers are:
 blackhole-1.iana.org
 blackhole-2.iana.org
 prisoner.iana.org

These servers are configured to answer any query with a "nonexistent address" answer. This helps to reduce wait times because the (negative) answer is given immediately and thus no wait for a timeout is necessary. Additionally, the answer returned is also allowed to be cached by recursive DNS servers. This is especially helpful because a second lookup for the same address performed by the same node would probably be answered from the local cache instead of querying the authoritative servers again. This helps reduce the network load significantly. According to IANA, "the blackhole servers generally answer thousands of queries per second".
Because the load on the IANA blackhole servers became very high, an alternative service, AS112, has been created, mostly run by volunteer operators.

AS112
The AS112 project is a group of volunteer name server operators joined in an autonomous system. They run anycasted instances of the name servers that answer reverse DNS lookups for private network and link-local addresses sent to the public Internet. These queries are ambiguous by their nature, and cannot be answered correctly. Providing negative answers reduces the load on the public DNS infrastructure.

History
Before 2001, the in-addr.arpa zones for the private networks were delegated to a single instance of name servers, blackhole-1.iana.org and blackhole-2.iana.org, called the blackhole servers. The IANA-run servers were under increasing load from improperly-configured NAT networks, leaking out reverse DNS queries, also causing unnecessary load on the root servers. The decision was made by a small subset of root server operators to run the reverse delegations; each announcing the network using the autonomous system number of 112. Later, the group of volunteers has grown to include many other organizations.

An alternative approach, using DNAME redirection, was adopted by the IETF in May 2015.

Answered zones
The name servers participating in the AS112 project are each configured to answer authoritatively for the following zones:

 10.in-addr.arpa
 16.172.in-addr.arpa
 17.172.in-addr.arpa
 18.172.in-addr.arpa
 19.172.in-addr.arpa
 20.172.in-addr.arpa
 21.172.in-addr.arpa
 22.172.in-addr.arpa
 23.172.in-addr.arpa
 24.172.in-addr.arpa
 25.172.in-addr.arpa
 26.172.in-addr.arpa
 27.172.in-addr.arpa
 28.172.in-addr.arpa
 29.172.in-addr.arpa
 30.172.in-addr.arpa
 31.172.in-addr.arpa
 168.192.in-addr.arpa
 For the  link-local addresses:
 254.169.in-addr.arpa
 For unique identification purposes:
 hostname.as112.net

References

External links
 The IANA abuse faq which contains information about the blackhole servers.
 AS112 web page
 RSSAC Meeting Atlanta 2002 Notes describing  network queries impact on the root servers.
 Mailing list for AS112 operators.

Domain Name System